Luis Alayza y Paz Soldán (November 30, 1883 – November 15, 1976) was a Peruvian writer and diplomat who also served as a professor at National University of San Marcos, in Lima.

Works
 La sed eterna
 Dau-el-kamar
 Clipper y guerra
 León Garaban
 La higuera de Pizarro
 La capa roja
 Unanue, San Martín y Bolivar
 Hipólito Unanue
 El gran mariscal José De La Mar
 La cláusula de la nación mas favorecida
 La Constitución de Cadiz de 1812
 Historia y romance del viejo Miraflores
 Las misteriosas islas del Perú
 Tahuantinsuyo
 La campaña de la Breña
 Geografia concertada del Perú
 Las Sociedades Anónimas
 Mi país, geografía e historia

People from Lima
National University of San Marcos alumni
Academic staff of the National University of San Marcos
1883 births
1976 deaths
Peruvian diplomats
Peruvian male writers